Leftback is the fourth studio album by Little Brother. It was released on April 21, 2010 via Hall of Justus Records.

Background
During a May 2008 interview with hiphopgame.com, Rapper Big Pooh hinted that he and Phonte may never record another album together. "That's so far in the future. We don't know if we are even gonna do another Little Brother album at this point. We are working on our personal projects right now.[4] After this report, Phonte did announce another album--Leftback--but he also announced that the group would subsequently take a Black Star-esque hiatus, wherein he and Big Pooh will collaborate, but another group album will not be released for a long while[5]. Recently, former group member 9th Wonder mentioned through his Twitter that "A Little Brother album doesn't sound like a bad idea these days man, people are leaving, you just don't know..", stemming from the passing of the former member of Slum Village Baatin.

Most recently, Rapper Big Pooh posted a bulletin via MySpace stating that he, along with 9th Wonder and Phonte, are no longer doing features as a group, but that he was still available to do solo features as himself. In the same post, he also mentioned that Leftback was near the end of the completion process.

On March 27, 2010, Phonte and 9th Wonder fought through Twitter over a beat that 9th Wonder produced and did not want on the album Leftback.

The album was leaked on April 9. Early reviews of the album rated it beneath the level of their earlier work.

Commercial performance
The album sold 4,600 copies in its first week; it debuted at #128 on the Billboard 200.

Track listing

Personnel
Credits adapted from liner notes.

 Mischa "Big Dho" Burgess - executive producer, art direction
 Phonte - writer, performer, recording engineer, mixing, addiditonal background vocals, executive producer
 Rapper Big Pooh - writer, performer, executive producer
 Khrysis - recording engineer, mixing, producer
 Soiree Records - mastering
 Milosz Wachowiak - art direction, graphic design

References

2010 albums
Little Brother (group) albums
Albums produced by Khrysis
Albums produced by Mr. Porter
Albums produced by Symbolyc One